Zaria is a city in Kaduna State, Nigeria.

Zaria may also refer to:

Zaria (goddess), or Zoria, the Slavic goddess of beauty
Zaria (gastropod), a genus of gastropods in the family Turritellidae

People
Countess Zaria of Orange-Nassau, Jonkvrouwe van Amsberg (born 2006), member of the Dutch royal family

See also 
Zarya (disambiguation)
Zorya (disambiguation)
Zorya, two goddesses in Slavic mythology
Zoria, a village in Donetsk Oblast, Ukraine